The 2002 Pendle Borough Council election took place on 2 May 2002 to elect members of Pendle Borough Council in Lancashire, England. The whole council was up for election with boundary changes since the last election in 2000 reducing the number of seats by 2. The council stayed under no overall control.

Background
After the 2000 election Labour was the largest party with 23 of the 51 seats, compared to 19 for the Liberal Democrats and 9 Conservatives. In the early part of 2002 however the gap between Labour and the Liberal Democrats narrowed after Labour councillor Kathleen Shore defected to the Liberal Democrats.

The whole council was being elected in 2002 for the first time since 1976 after boundary changes. These changes meant 49 seats were contested from 20 wards, with new wards of Blacko and Higherford, Higham and Pendleside and Old Laund Booth being created.

Campaign

In total 144 candidates stood in the election with the Labour, Liberal Democrat and Conservative parties standing in most wards, along with 2 candidates from the Socialist Alliance and some independents. Several councillors stood down at the election, including Conservative group leader Roy Clarkson, Liberal Democrat former mayors Ian Gilhespy and Gill Gilhespy and Labour's Tim Ormrod, while Liberal Democrat Lord Tony Greaves stood for the party in Walverden ward.

Issues in the election included the handling of proposals for closing residential homes, the proposed demolition of houses in Nelson, the condition of private housing in the area, the selection of the area as part of the Neighbourhood Management Pathfinder Programme and policing.

The election saw a trial of optional postal voting in an attempt to increase turnout, but there were allegations that the process was being abused. The Liberal Democrats claimed that about 900 postal votes in four marginal wards were being sent to common addresses, instead of the voters own address. Having the postal vote sent to another address was not illegal, but the Liberal Democrats feared fraud and that people had signed postal ballots without understanding what they were doing. The police made an investigation after one agent for the Liberal Democrats requested it, with the allegations also being looked into by the Electoral Commission.

Election result
The results saw the Labour and Liberal Democrat parties both finish on 19 seats, while the Conservatives won 11. With the number of seats  having been reduced by 2, Labour lost 3 seats, the Liberal Democrats lost 1 seat and the Conservatives gained 2 seats. The closest result came in Walverden ward, where it took 8 recounts before the final result was declared, with Labour winning the second seat in the ward by 2 votes over the Liberal Democrats.

Following the election Labour group leader Azhar Ali remained leader of the council, after winning a 19 to 18 vote over Liberal Democrat group leader Alan Davies at the full council meeting.

Ward results

References

2002 English local elections
2002
2000s in Lancashire